Plandome Heights is a village in Nassau County, on the North Shore of Long Island, in New York, United States. It is considered part of the Greater Manhasset area, which is anchored by Manhasset. The population was 1,005 at the 2010 census.

The Incorporated Village of Plandome Heights is located entirely within the Town of North Hempstead and is the southernmost of the three Plandomes.

History 
In the early 20th century, Benjamin N. Duke of the Duke tobacco family developed large parts of what is now Plandome Heights through the Plandome Heights Company, which was one of Duke's real estate ventures; many of these homes were built in the Spanish style, which was a popular architectural style at the time. The Duke family owned large portions of Plandome Heights in the early 20th century.

Prior to incorporating, the residents in the original part of Plandome Heights (the western and central portions) had unsuccessfully petitioned for neighboring Plandome to annex their area. This resulted in residents deciding to incorporate following Plandome's refusal, and Plandome Heights officially became a village on June 11, 1929.

In 1949, Plandome Heights annexed an area adjacent to and immediately east of the village, called Chester Hill; this area is at the southeastern end of Plandome Heights, east of Plandome Road, and includes streets such as Chester Drive and Winthrope Road.

Like the villages of Plandome and Plandome Manor to its north, Plandome Heights derives its name from the Latin 'Planus Domus', meaning plain, or level home.

Geography

Plandome Heights is located within the Manhasset Bay Watershed, which in turn is located within the larger Long Island Sound/Atlantic Ocean Watershed.

Demographics

As of the census of 2000, there were 971 people, 324 households, and 268 families residing in the village. The population density was 5,350.6 people per square mile (2,082.8/km2). There were 328 housing units at an average density of 1,807.4 per square mile (703.6/km2). The racial makeup of the village was 92.28% White, 0.31% African American, 0.10% Native American, 6.80% Asian, 0.10% Pacific Islander, 0.10% from other races, and 0.31% from two or more races. Hispanic or Latino of any race were 3.09% of the population.

There were 324 households, out of which 42.0% had children under the age of 18 living with them, 72.8% were married couples living together, 7.1% had a female householder with no husband present, and 17.0% were non-families. 15.1% of all households were made up of individuals, and 11.4% had someone living alone who was 65 years of age or older. The average household size was 3.00 and the average family size was 3.33.

In the village, the population was spread out, with 28.6% under the age of 18, 5.0% from 18 to 24, 24.6% from 25 to 44, 27.8% from 45 to 64, and 13.9% who were 65 years of age or older. The median age was 40 years. For every 100 females, there were 91.9 males. For every 100 females age 18 and over, there were 86.8 males.

The median income for a household in the village was $123,199, and the median income for a family was $142,088. Males had a median income of $100,000 versus $46,000 for females. The per capita income for the village was $57,050. About 0.7% of families and 1.5% of the population were below the poverty line, including none of those under age 18 and 5.0% of those age 65 or over.

Government

Village government 
As of March 2022, the Mayor of Plandome Heights is Kenneth C. Riscica and the Village Trustees are Daniel Cataldo, Mary Hauck, Kristina Lobosco, Florence Musalo, Gus Panopoulos, and Norman Taylor.

The following is a list of Plandome Heights' mayors, from 1929 to present:

Representation in higher government

Town representation 
Plandome Heights is located in the Town of North Hempstead's 6th district, which as of November 2021 is represented on the Town Board by Mariann Dalimonte (D – Port Washington).

Nassau County representation 
Plandome Heights is located in Nassau County's 9th Legislative district, which as of November 2021 is represented in the Nassau County Legislature by Richard Nicoello (R–New Hyde Park).

New York State representation

New York State Assembly 
Plandome Heights is located within the New York State Assembly's 16th Assembly district, which as of November 2021 is represented by Gina Sillitti (D–Manorhaven).

New York State Senate 
Plandome Heights is located in the New York State Senate's 7th State Senate district, which as of November 2021 is represented in the New York State Senate by Anna Kaplan (D–North Hills).

Federal representation

United States Congress 
Plandome Heights is located in New York's 3rd congressional district, which as of November 2021 is represented in the United States Congress by Tom Suozzi (D–Glen Cove).

United States Senate 
Like the rest of New York, Plandome Heights is represented in the United States Senate by Charles Schumer (D) and Kirsten Gillibrand (D).

Politics 
In the 2016 U.S. presidential election, the majority of Plandome Heights voters voted for Donald Trump (R).

Education

School district 
The Village of Plandome Heights is located entirely within the boundaries of the Manhasset Union Free School District. As such, all children who reside in Plandome Heights and attend public schools go to Manhasset's schools.

Library district 
Plandome Heights is located entirely within the boundaries of the Manhasset Library District.

Infrastructure

Transportation

Road 

Major roads in Plandome Heights include Plandome Road and Webster Avenue; the Manhasset–Plandome Heights border runs along the centerline of Webster Avenue west of its intersection with Brookwold Drive.

Street layout 

Plandome Heights features multiple types of street layouts. The area west of Plandome Road includes several meandering roads and cul-de-sacs, whereas the area east of Plandome Road features a traditional street grid.

Rail 
There are no train stations in Plandome Heights. The nearest Long Island Rail Road station to the village is Manhasset on the Port Washington Branch.

Bus 
No bus routes run through Plandome Heights.

Utilities

Natural gas 
National Grid USA provides natural gas to homes and businesses that are hooked up to natural gas lines in Plandome Heights.

Power 
PSEG Long Island provides power to all homes and businesses within Plandome Heights.

Sewage 
Plandome Heights is not connected to any sanitary sewer systems. As such, all areas within the village rely on cesspools and septic systems.

Trash collection 
Trash collection services in Plandome Heights are provided by Dejana Industries, under contract with the Village of Plandome Heights.

Water 
Plandome Heights is located within the boundaries of the Manhasset–Lakeville Water District, which provides the entirety of Plandome Heights with water.

Notable people 
 Bloodgood Cutter – Landowner, farmer, and poet.
 Albert F. D'Oench – Architect, New York City Superintendent of Buildings, and the husband of Alice Grace D'Oench, the eldest child of W. R. Grace.
 Genesta M. Strong –Politician. Strong was the first female from Nassau County to be elected to the New York State Assembly; lived at 27 Chester Drive.

References

External links 

 Official website
 Plandome Heights Civic Association

Manhasset, New York
Villages in New York (state)
Villages in Nassau County, New York
Populated coastal places in New York (state)